Johanna Magnusson (born 15 November 1998) is a Swedish badminton player. She won gold at the 2017 European Junior Championships in the girls' doubles event with her partner Emma Karlsson.

Achievements

European Junior Championships 
Girls' doubles

BWF International Challenge/Series (3 titles, 5 runners-up) 
Women's doubles

  BWF International Challenge tournament
  BWF International Series tournament
  BWF Future Series tournament

BWF Junior Tournament 
Girls' doubles

Personal life 
Magnusson comes from a badminton loving family, her mother is Maria Bengtsson, who was once among the top doubles players in the world.

References

External links 
 

1998 births
Living people
Sportspeople from Malmö
Swedish female badminton players
Badminton players at the 2019 European Games
European Games competitors for Sweden
21st-century Swedish women